Rhamnosidase may refer to:
 Alpha-L-rhamnosidase
 Beta-L-rhamnosidase
 Naringinase